Al Jamila is an Arabic monthly women's magazine, published in Dubai. It is one of the publications of the Saudi Research and Marketing Group.

History and ownership
Al Jamila was firstly launched in London and then, in Riyadh in October 1994. The magazine was relocated from London to Dubai in 2005. 

It is one of the magazines published by Saudi Research and Publishing Company, a subsidiary of Saudi Research and Marketing Group. The company also owns other magazines such as Sayidaty, The Majalla, Urdu Magazine and Hia as well as newspapers such as Arab News, Al Eqtisadiah, Urdu News and Asharq al Awsat.

As of 2013 Mohammed Fahad Al Harthi was the editor-in-chief of the magazine, who had been in this post since 2004. He is also editor-in-chief of Sayidaty.

Content
Al Jamila mainly involves news on beauty and health, and offers its readers in-depth articles about the latest make-up looks, beauty products and treatments as well as news on health and fitness.

Readership
It was reported by Al Khaleejiah in 2011 that Al Jamila is read  89.7% by females and 10.3% by males. It was further indicated that female readers of the magazine are those between 18 and 29 years old. Therefore, the target audience of the magazine is teenagers and young adult women in Saudi Arabia and other Arab countries.

See also
 List of magazines in Saudi Arabia

References

External links

1994 establishments in Saudi Arabia
2005 establishments in the United Arab Emirates
Arabic-language magazines
Magazines established in 1994
Magazines published in London
Magazines published in Saudi Arabia
Magazines published in the United Arab Emirates
Mass media in Riyadh
Mass media in Dubai
Monthly magazines
Women's magazines